The following lists events that happened during 1986 in Sri Lanka.

Incumbents
 President – J. R. Jayewardene
 Prime Minister – Ranasinghe Premadasa
 Chief Justice – Suppiah Sharvananda

Events
 The Akkaraipattu massacre happened on 19 February 1986 when approximately 80 Sri Lankan Tamil farm workers were alleged to be killed by the Sri Lankan Army personnel and their bodies were found burnt in Eastern Sri Lanka.
 The cricket Asia Cup of 1986 is held in Sri Lanka. 
 On 3 May 1986, 21 people are killed and 41 injured in an LTTE bombing on an Air Lanka flight set to fly to the Maldives. The attack was condemned by France and Britain.

Notes 

a.  Gunaratna, Rohan. (1998). Pg.353, Sri Lanka's Ethnic Crisis and National Security, Colombo: South Asian Network on Conflict Research.

References

 
Sri Lanka
Sri Lanka
Years of the 20th century in Sri Lanka